Martin Greenberg (February 3, 1918 – May 19, 2021) was an American poet and translator.

Life
Greenberg was the son of a Jewish couple, who were immigrants from Lithuania. He was born in Norfolk, Virginia in February 1918. His elder brother, Clement Greenberg, was an influential art critic in the United States in the 1950s to 1970s. Martin graduated from the University of Michigan and then served in World War II becoming a staff sergeant. On June 9, 1962, he married Paula Fox. Martin had a son, David, from a previous marriage, and three stepchildren; Linda, Adam and Gabriel. His translations have appeared in The New Criterion. He died in Brooklyn, New York in May 2021 at the age of 103.

Awards
 1989 Harold Morton Landon Translation Award

Works

Translations

Non-fiction

References

1918 births
2021 deaths
20th-century American poets
20th-century translators
American centenarians
American military personnel of World War II
American people of Lithuanian-Jewish descent
German–English translators
Men centenarians
Jewish poets
Writers from Norfolk, Virginia
Translators of Johann Wolfgang von Goethe
University of Michigan alumni
American non-commissioned personnel